P78-1 or Solwind was a United States satellite launched aboard an Atlas F rocket from Vandenberg Air Force Base in California on February 24, 1979. The satellite's mission was extended by several weeks, so that it operated until it was destroyed in orbit on September 13, 1985, to test the ASM-135 ASAT anti-satellite missile.

Construction and payload 
The satellite's Orbiting Solar Observatory (OSO) platform included a solar-oriented sail and a rotating wheel section. Ball Aerospace was the primary contractor for design and construction, and provided the attitude control and determination computer programs. The P78-1 carried a gamma-ray spectrometer, a white-light coronagraph, an extreme-ultraviolet imager, an X-ray spectrometer, a high-latitude particle spectrometer, an aerosol monitor, and an X-ray monitor. The X-ray monitor, designated NRL-608 or XMON, was a collaboration between the Naval Research Laboratory and Los Alamos National Laboratory. The white-light coronagraph and the ultraviolet imager were combined in a single package, designated NRL-401 or SOLWIND, which was built by the Naval Research Laboratory.  The coronagraph was the flight spare of the white-light coronagraph on the OSO-7 satellite.  The ultraviolet imager used a CCD imager, one of the first uses of a CCD in space.

Discovery of comets 

P78-1 was the first satellite in space to discover a comet in general and a sungrazing comet in particular. In total, 9 sungrazing comets, all belonging to the Kreutz group, were discovered on images taken by the Solwind coronagraph:

Apart from these yet another comet C/1984 R1 (SOLWIND) was found by Rainer Kracht, a German amateur astronomer, on 23 July 2005 in Solwind's images of 17 Sep 1984. Its perihelion distance of 0.1051 AU was at least ten times larger than that of the previously found true sungrazers.

Destruction 
By 1985, the satellite's batteries were degrading. This caused more and more frequent "under-voltage cutoffs", a condition where the satellite detected a low main bus voltage and automatically shut down all non-vital systems. In addition, the last of the three tape recorders failed in the spring of 1985, so data collection could only occur while the spacecraft was in contact with a ground station. A normal contact lasted only about 15 minutes, so this was a serious impediment.  Special arrangements could be made to string several contacts together.  As a result of these failures, an ever-increasing amount of time and network resources were spent reconfiguring the satellite for normal operation. Data collection from the few remaining payloads was severely limited. Because of the additional burden on the Air Force Satellite Control Network (e.g., extra support and antenna time at the tracking stations), discussions were already underway to terminate the mission.

This led to the satellite being chosen as a test target for an ASM-135 ASAT anti-satellite missile. The mission was extended for several weeks solely to support the test. During this final phase, the satellite was often allowed to remain in the under-voltage condition for several days at a time.

The test resulted in 285 cataloged pieces of orbital debris. 1 piece of debris remained in orbit to at least May 2004, but had deorbited by 2008. The last piece of debris, COSPAR 1979-017GX, SATCAT 16564, deorbited 9 May 2004 according to SATCAT.

The test outraged some scientists because although five of P78-1's instruments had failed at the time of the test, two instruments remained in operation, and the satellite was what one solar physicist called "the backbone of coronal research through the last seven years".

Gallery

See also 

 2007 Chinese anti-satellite missile test
 USA 193

References

External links 
 NASA page about the satellite 
 List of research papers based on P78-1 observations
 
 Encyclopedia Astronautica Solwind Page

NASA space probes
Intentionally destroyed artificial satellites
Spacecraft launched in 1979
Satellite collisions